The Biathlon World Championships 2019 took place in Östersund, Sweden, from 6 to 17 March 2019.

There were a total of 12 competitions: sprint, pursuit, individual, mass start, and relay races for men and women, and two mixed relay races. The single mixed relay was on the program of the World Championships for the first time. All the events during this championships also counted for the 2018–19 Biathlon World Cup season.

Host selection
On 7 September 2014, Östersund won the voting (27 votes) in St. Wolfgang, Austria over Antholz, Italy (16 votes), Nové Město na Moravě, Czech Republic (4 votes) and Khanty-Mansiysk, Russia (2 votes). This was third time when World Championships was held in Östersund; the town had previously hosted the event in 1970 and 2008.

Schedule
All times are local (UTC+1).

Medal summary

Medal table

Top athletes
All athletes with two or more medals.

Men

Women

Mixed

References

External links
Official website 

 
2019
2019 in biathlon
2019 in Swedish sport
International sports competitions hosted by Sweden
Sports competitions in Östersund
Biathlon competitions in Sweden
March 2019 sports events in Sweden